Jennings–Gallagher House is a historic building in California, Pennsylvania.

It is at 429 Wood Street, the corner of Fifth and Wood Streets, California Borough, Washington County, Pennsylvania.

It is a colonial revival house, built in 1903 by Jonathan Winnett Jennings, a Methodist minister from the Monongahela Valley. The house stayed in the Jennings family until 1919; in 1930 when it was acquired by the Gallagher family. Charles Gallagher was the general superintendent of the Allied Chemical Corporation at Newell, Pennsylvania, a director of People's National Bank and a Trustee of California University of Pennsylvania.

In 1993, it was left to the Historical Society. The house is designated as a historic residential landmark/farmstead by the Washington County History & Landmarks Foundation. It retains its original woodwork, stained glass and fireplaces.

References

External links
[ National Register nomination form]

Houses on the National Register of Historic Places in Pennsylvania
Queen Anne architecture in Pennsylvania
Colonial Revival architecture in California
Houses completed in 1903
Houses in Washington County, Pennsylvania
National Register of Historic Places in Washington County, Pennsylvania